The Uganda Film Festival Award for Best Cinematography is an award presented annually by Uganda Communications Commission (UCC) at the Uganda Film Festival Awards.

Nominees and Winners
The table shows the winners and nominees for the Best Cinematography award.

References

Ugandan film awards